Willard is a small unincorporated community in Skamania County, in southwestern Washington.

The community of Mill A and the Willard National Fish Hatchery is also situated on the river, just outside of the town.

References

Unincorporated communities in Skamania County, Washington
Unincorporated communities in Washington (state)